Robert McIntyre (born January 23, 1944) is an American former professional basketball player. He played in the American Basketball Association for the New Jersey Americans / New York Nets, as well as in the Continental Basketball Association for the Allentown Jets and in FIBA Euroleague for Real Madrid. While with Real Madrid for the 1966–67 season, McIntyre won a Euroleague championship.

References

1944 births
Living people
Allentown Jets players
American expatriate basketball people in Spain
American men's basketball players
Basketball players from New York City
Holy Cross High School (Flushing) alumni
New Jersey Americans players
New York Nets players
Parade High School All-Americans (boys' basketball)
People from Bayside, Queens
Real Madrid Baloncesto players
Small forwards
Sportspeople from Queens, New York
St. John's Red Storm men's basketball players
St. Louis Hawks draft picks